Phajol Muangson (born 1933) is a Thai boxer. He competed in the men's flyweight event at the 1956 Summer Olympics.

References

1933 births
Living people
Phajol Muangson
Phajol Muangson
Boxers at the 1956 Summer Olympics
Place of birth missing (living people)
Flyweight boxers